Alfred Kärcher SE & Co. KG is a German family-owned company that operates worldwide and is known for its high-pressure cleaners, floor care equipment, parts cleaning systems, wash water treatment, military decontamination equipment and window vacuum cleaners.

Headquartered in Winnenden, Germany, it produces both cleaning equipment and full cleaning systems. The company is the world market leader in cleaning technology and employs more than 10,000 people worldwide. In 2017 it posted sales revenues of €2.5 billion ($2.88 billion) and sold more than 13 million machines. Kärcher has 100 subsidiaries in 60 countries. In 2020, Kärcher established its North American headquarters in Aurora, Colorado.

History 
The inventor Alfred Kärcher (1901–59) from Baden-Württemberg founded the company in 1935 in Stuttgart-Bad Cannstatt. Initially Kärcher specialised in the design of industrial submersible heating elements, i.e. in salt smelters which were heated with immersion heaters. After numerous experiments, a hardening furnace for alloys was produced, the so-called “Kärcher Salt-Bath Furnace”. Some 1,200 units were sold up to 1945. During World War II, the company works for the Luftwaffe. Kärcher invented the first modern pressure washer, the DS 350 in 1950. The company's main focus then switched to cleaning equipment for professional and private users. Since then, Kärcher has made lead in the design and development of pressure washers. The company's product range was expanded and now covers the entire field of cleaning (sweepers, detergents, scrubber-driers, wet and dry vacuums, vacuum cleaners, battery-powered brooms, steam cleaners, dry ice blasting equipment, parts cleaners, water treatment systems, vehicle washes and wastewater recycling systems). Kärcher also offers pumps and watering systems.

In 1974 the corporate color was changed from blue to yellow. From that year, under the leadership of Alfred Kärcher's widow Irene Kärcher, the company launched the HD 555, the first pressure washer for private users.

Today the family-owned company, which is based in Winnenden near Stuttgart, is represented in 160 countries with 100 subsidiaries all over the world, selling commercial cleaning equipment as well as cleaning equipment for the private consumer.

Kärcher owns the American brands of Landa, Hotsy, and Shark pressure washers, Cuda parts washers, Watermaze water treatment systems, and Windsor Kärcher Group floor cleaning systems, and Italian manufacturing company Hawk Pumps, or Woma Pumps in Germany. They are the primary supplier of cleaning systems to both NATO and the US Military.

Competitive innovation
In the 2021 review of WIPO's annual World Intellectual Property Indicators Kärcher ranked 10th in the world, with 47 designs in industrial design registrations being published under the Hague System during 2020. This position is up on their previous 12th place ranking for 35 industrial design registrations being published in 2019.

Common noun 
In some countries such as Germany, France, Poland, Russia, Georgia, Mexico, Spain and the United States the term Kärcher is colloquially used synonymously with a pressure washer used to clean cars, outdoor equipment etc.

French politician Nicolas Sarkozy once declared that La Courneuve, a banlieue outside of Paris where a boy was killed by a stray gunshot, would be "cleaned out with a Kärcher" (nettoyer la cité au Kärcher) — meaning all criminals and other undesirables should be removed and washed out. This comment was highly controversial, as many French associate the banlieues with immigrants, especially North Africans.

Sarkozy's use of the word led to it becoming a verb: "to Karcher" or "Karcherize". Presidential candidate Jean-Marie Le Pen told residents of Argenteuil, many of them immigrants, "If some want to Karcherize you, to exclude you, we want to help you get out of these ghettos." As a response, Kärcher France sent a letter to all of the candidates in the 2007 presidential election asking them not to use the company's name this way, and has run ads in newspapers disassociating itself from the remarks.

Cultural sponsorship
Under its cultural sponsorship program, Kärcher has supported more than 90 projects to clean internationally prominent buildings such as the National Monument in Jakarta (2014), the London Eye in London (2013), the Space Needle in Seattle (2008), the Presidents' heads at the Mount Rushmore National Memorial (2005), the Colossi of Memnon in Luxor (2003), the Colonnades on St. Peter's Square in Rome (1998), the Brandenburg Gate in Berlin (1990) the Statue of Liberty in New York City (1985) and the Statue of Christ in Rio de Janeiro (1980). In 2011 it cleaned the Loreley open-air stage and the N Seoul Tower. Kärcher is also a partner of SOS Children's Villages and a member of the UN Global Compact network.

Kärcher is the official cleaning equipment supplier to the 2016 Summer Olympics and the Sochi 2014 winter Olympic Games.

See also

 High pressure cleaning

References

Companies based in Baden-Württemberg
Manufacturing companies of Germany
German brands
Manufacturing companies established in 1935
1935 establishments in Germany
Vacuum cleaner manufacturers
German companies established in 1935